Juancho is a town in the Pedernales Province of the Dominican Republic. It is a municipal district of the municipality of Pedernales.

Sources 
 – World-Gazetteer.com

References 

Populated places in Pedernales Province